The 2013 Big Ten Conference men's soccer tournament was the 23rd postseason tournament to determine the champion of the Big Ten Conference. The defending champion was Michigan State. The tournament was held from November 13–17, 2013.

Bracket

Schedule

Quarterfinals

Semifinals

Final

Statistical leaders

See also 
 Big Ten Conference Men's Soccer Tournament
 2013 Big Ten Conference men's soccer season
 2013 NCAA Division I men's soccer season
 2013 NCAA Division I Men's Soccer Championship

References

External links 
 Tournament Bracket

Big Ten Men's Soccer Tournament
Big Ten Men's Soccer Tournament
Big Ten Men's Soccer Tournament